The Liberal Democrat peers elect the Leader of the Liberal Democrats in the House of Lords. Until the election of Lord Wallace of Tankerness in October 2013, all previous leaders had been members of the Labour Party who left to form the Social Democratic Party in 1981 before merging with the Liberal Party in 1988.

List of Liberal Democrat Leaders in the House of Lords

See also
 List of United Kingdom Whig and allied party leaders, 1801–1859
 Leader of the Liberal Party (UK)
 Leader of the Liberal Democrats

External links
Liberal Democrat History Group

 

pl:Liberalni Demokraci#Liderzy liberalnych demokratów